The 1982 La Flèche Wallonne was the 46th edition of La Flèche Wallonne cycle race and was held on 15 April 1982. The race started in Charleroi and finished in Spa. The race was won by Mario Beccia of the Hoonved–Bottecchia team.

General classification

References

1982 in road cycling
1982
April 1982 sports events in Europe
1982 in Belgian sport
1982 Super Prestige Pernod